Richard Dowse was Dean of Clonmacnoise from 1892 to 1900.

Dowse was born in County Wicklow and educated at Trinity College, Dublin and ordained in 1850. After a curacy in Collinstown he held incumbencies at Clonfad and Castletown. He was also Rural Dean of Mullingar before his appointment to the deanery.

References

Alumni of Trinity College Dublin
Deans of Clonmacnoise
People from County Wicklow
Church of Ireland priests
19th-century Irish Anglican priests
Year of birth missing
Year of death missing